Glyphidocera placentae is a moth in the family Autostichidae. It was described by David Adamski in 2005. It is found in Costa Rica.

References

Moths described in 2005
Taxa named by David Adamski
Moths of Central America
Glyphidocerinae